Kugelhorn is a mountain of Bavaria, Germany.

References 

Mountains of Bavaria
Mountains of the Alps